Oneida County is a county  in the state of Wisconsin, United States. At the 2020 census, the population was 37,845. Its county seat is Rhinelander.

History
Oneida County was formed in 1887 from sections of Lincoln County. It was named after the indigenous Oneida tribe, one of the five nations of the Iroquois.

Geography
Most people visit Oneida County to enjoy its lakes. In particular, tourists flock to Minocqua, a town of nearly 5,000 people with a summer population around 15,000.

Adjacent counties
 Forest County - east
 Langlade County - southeast
 Lincoln County - south
 Price County - west
 Vilas County - north

Major highways
  U.S. Highway 8
  U.S. Highway 45
  U.S. Highway 51
  Highway 17 (Wisconsin)
  Highway 32 (Wisconsin)
  Highway 47 (Wisconsin)
  Highway 70 (Wisconsin)

Railroads
Watco

Buses
Bay Area Rural Transit
List of intercity bus stops in Wisconsin

Airports
Oneida County is served by two public-use airports:
 Rhinelander-Oneida County Airport (KRHI) serves the county and surrounding communities with both scheduled commercial jet service and general aviation services.
 Three Lakes Municipal Airport enhances county general aviation service.

Dolhun Field Airport is also located in the county, but it is for private use by the members of the Dolhun Field Airpark Owners Association.

National protected area
 Nicolet National Forest (part)

Demographics

2020 census
As of the census of 2020, the population was 37,845. The racial makeup of the county was 93.7% White, 1.2% Native American, 0.6% Black or African American, 0.5% Asian, 0.6% from other races, and 3.3% from two or more races. Ethnically, the population was 1.5% Hispanic or Latino of any race.

2000 census
At the census of 2000,  36,776 people, 15,333 households, and 10,487 families resided in the county.  The population density was 33 people per square mile (13/km2). The 26,627 housing units averaged 24 per square mile (9/km2). The racial makeup of the county was 97.71% White, 0.33% Black or African American, 0.66% Native American, 0.30% Asian, 0.05% Pacific Islander, 0.21% from other races, and 0.75% from two or more races. About 0.66% of the population was Hispanic or Latino of any race. The ancestry of the population was around 44.4% was of German, 8.8% Polish, 7.9% Irish, 5.2% Norwegian, and 5.2% English.

Of the 15,333 households, 27.00% had children under the age of 18 living with them, 57.80% were married couples living together, 7.10% had a female householder with no husband present, and 31.60% were not families. About 26.40% of all households were made up of individuals, and 12.00% had someone living alone who was 65 years of age or older. The average household size was 2.34 and the average family size was 2.82.

In the county, the population was distributed as 22.30% under the age of 18, 5.70% from 18 to 24, 26.50% from 25 to 44, 26.80% from 45 to 64, and 18.70% who were 65 years of age or older. The median age was 42 years. For every 100 females, there were 99.20 males. For every 100 females age 18 and over, there were 97.30 males.

In 2017, there were 324 births, giving a general fertility rate of 66.2 births per 1000 women aged 15–44, the 24th highest rate out of all 72 Wisconsin counties.

Communities

City
 Rhinelander (county seat)

Towns

 Cassian
 Crescent
 Enterprise
 Hazelhurst
 Lake Tomahawk
 Little Rice
 Lynne
 Minocqua
 Monico
 Newbold
 Nokomis
 Pelican
 Piehl
 Pine Lake
 Schoepke
 Stella
 Sugar Camp
 Three Lakes
 Woodboro
 Woodruff

Census-designated places
 Lake Tomahawk
 Minocqua
 Three Lakes
 Woodruff

Unincorporated communities

 Clearwater Lake
 Clifford (partial)
 Crescent Corner
 Enterprise
 Gagen
 Gary Post
 Goodnow
 Harshaw
 Hazelhurst
 Jennings
 Lennox
 McCord
 Malvern
 Monico
 McNaughton
 Newbold
 Pelican Lake
 Pratt Junction
 Rantz
 Roosevelt
 Sugar Camp
 Starks
 Sunflower
 Tripoli (partial)
 Woodboro

Ghost towns/neighborhoods
 Manson

Politics

See also
 National Register of Historic Places listings in Oneida County, Wisconsin

References

Further reading
 Jones, George O. and Norman S. McVean (comp.) History of Lincoln, Oneida and Vilas Counties, Wisconsin. Minneapolis: H. C. Cooper, Jr., 1924.

External links
 Oneida County website 
 Oneida County map from the Wisconsin Department of Transportation

 
1887 establishments in Wisconsin
Populated places established in 1887